Nathaniel Irving (born July 12, 1988) is a former American football inside linebacker. He played college football at North Carolina State University and was drafted by the Denver Broncos in the third round of the 2011 NFL Draft.

Early life
Irving attended Wallace-Rose Hill High School in Teachey, North Carolina, where he tallied 110 tackles, six forced fumbles, three sacks, and one interception in his senior year. Regarded as only a two-star recruit by Rivals.com, he was not listed among the top prospects of the class of 2006.

College career
Irving was a 2010 All-American selection by Sports Illustrated and Scout.com.  Irving holds the NCAA FBS record for tackles for loss in a single game with eight in 2010.

Professional career

Denver Broncos (2011–2014)
Irving was selected in the third round (67th overall) by the Denver Broncos in the 2011 NFL Draft. He officially signed with the Broncos on July 29, 2011.

Irving was placed on injured reserve in November 2014 with a knee injury that required surgery. He had 44 tackles through 8 games prior to the injury. Irving became a free agent at the end of the 2014 season.

Indianapolis Colts (2015)
On March 20, 2015, Irving signed a 3-year, $9.25 million contract with the Indianapolis Colts. On December 8, 2015, Irving was placed on injured reserve.

On September 3, 2016, Irving was released by the Colts as part of final roster cuts.

References

External links
NC State Wolfpack bio
Denver Broncos bio
Indianapolis Colts bio

1988 births
Living people
People from Wallace, North Carolina
Players of American football from North Carolina
American football linebackers
NC State Wolfpack football players
Denver Broncos players
Indianapolis Colts players